XY Chelsea is a 2019 American-British documentary film directed by Tim Travers Hawkins, written by Travers Hawkins, Mark Monroe, Enat Sidi, and Andrea B. Scott. Laura Poitras serves as an executive producer. The film follows Chelsea Manning, after she is released from prison.

The film had its world premiere at the Tribeca Film Festival on May 1, 2019. It was released in the United Kingdom on May 24, 2019, by Dogwoof, and in the United States on June 7, 2019, by Showtime.

Synopsis
The film follows Chelsea Manning, after she's released from prison, as she returns to activism, speaks to the press and runs for senate. Manning, Nancy Hollander, Vince Ward, Chase Strangio, Lisa Rein, Christina DiPasquale, Susan Manning, Janus Rose, and Kelly Wright appear in the film.

Production
In January 2018, it was announced Showtime would produce and distribute the film, with Tim Travers Hawkins directing, with Laura Poitras set to executive produce.

Release
The film had its world premiere at the Tribeca Film Festival on May 1, 2019. Prior to, Dogwoof acquired U.K. distribution rights to the film, and set it for a May 24, 2019, release. It was released in the United States on June 7, 2019.

Reception

Critical reception
On Metacritic, the film holds a rating of 60 out of 100, based on 9 critics, indicating "mixed or average reviews".

References

External links

 
 

2019 documentary films
2019 films
2019 LGBT-related films
American documentary films
American LGBT-related films
Biographical films about LGBT people
British documentary films
British LGBT-related films
Films about trans women
Showtime (TV network) documentary films
Topic Studios films
Transgender-related documentary films
2010s English-language films
2010s American films
2010s British films